Joe Marchant may refer to:

 Joe Marchant (footballer) (1884–?), Australian rules footballer
 Joe Marchant (rugby union) (born 1996), rugby player for Harlequins and England